Dave O'Sullivan is a New Zealand Thoroughbred racehorse trainer.  He is notable for having trained Horlicks to win the 1989 Japan Cup and many Group One races in New Zealand and Australia as well as being inducted into the New Zealand Racing Hall of Fame. 

O'Sullivan started as an apprentice jockey and had 125 wins over a decade of riding.  He won the 1953 Railway Stakes on Te Awa. He would go on to win the race six times as a trainer.

He became a licensed trainer in February 1961. During his training career he won one premiership title independently (1978-79 with 62 wins) and eleven in partnership with his son, Paul O'Sullivan.  He trained 1877 winners. 

Dave's son, Lance O'Sullivan was a champion jockey and also inducted into the New Zealand Racing Hall of Fame as well as being appointed an Officer of the New Zealand Order of Merit, for services to thoroughbred racing 2003 New Year Honours.

Notable horses and victories

Dave O'Sullivan trained or co-trained a large number of high-class horses, including:
 Horlicks, winner of the 1989 Japan Cup and LKS MacKinnon Stakes
 Miltak, winner of the 1994 Auckland Cup
 Mr Tiz winner of seven Group One races including the 1991 Galaxy Stakes, Railway Stakes (1989-91) and Telegraph Handicap (1989, 1990).
 Oopik
 La Souvronne, winner of the 1984 AJC Oaks
 Waverley Star

See also

 Murray Baker
 Colin Jillings
 Trevor McKee
 Graeme Rogerson
 Thoroughbred racing in New Zealand

References 

Year of birth missing (living people)
Living people
New Zealand racehorse trainers
Sportspeople from Waikato